The Anatomist (book) may refer to:

The Anatomist by Federico Andahazi, a 1996 novel
The Anatomist by Bill Hayes (writer), a 2008 nonfiction book about Gray's Anatomy